The 2008–09 Slovak Cup was the 40th season of Slovakia's annual knock-out cup competition and the sixteenth since the independence of Slovakia. It began on 5 August 2008 with Round 1 and ended on 20 May 2009 with the Final. The winners of the competition earned a place in the third qualifying round of the UEFA Europa League. Artmedia Petržalka were the defending champions.

First round
The games were played around 5 August 2008.

|}

Second round
The games were played around 16 September 2008.

|}

Third round
The games were played on 24 September 2008 (1 game), 30 September 2008 (4 games), 1 October 2008 (2 games) & 21 October 2008 (1 game).

|}

Quarter-finals
The first legs were played between 21 and 29 October 2008. The second legs were played on 4 November 2008 with the exception of Slovan – Žilina, which was played on 18 March 2009.

|}

Semi-finals
The first legs were played on 22 April 2009. The second legs were played on 5 May 2009.

|}

Final

External links
 profutbal.sk

References

Slovak Cup seasons
Slovak Cup
Cup